Albert Watson (born 8 September 1985) is a Northern Irish professional footballer who plays for NIFL Premiership club Larne as a defender.

Club career

Early career
Born in Belfast, Watson made his senior-club debut for Ballymena United on 4 December 2001 in a 1–1 draw against Institute, at 16 years of age. He attracted interest from Linfield in February 2008, although any interest concluded when Watson signed a new contract with Ballymena a few days later. In January 2011, Watson made his 300th appearance for the club.

In April 2011 he joined Linfield on a two-year contract, during which the team would capture two consecutive Premiership and Irish Cup doubles.

FC Edmonton
On 18 January 2013, it was announced that Watson, along with teammate Daryl Fordyce would not return to Linfield the following season, instead seeking new playing opportunities in Canada. On 25 February 2013, it was reported that both Watson and Fordyce would join FC Edmonton. Watson was named FC Edmonton captain prior to the 2013 NASL season, and after missing the first few months due to a torn MCL, went on to be named in the NASL Best XI for the season.

After the 2015 NASL season, Watson signed with the club for a fourth season. In August 2016, would go on to become the first player to make 100 appearances for the club. After FC Edmonton surrendered a league low 21 goals in 32 games during the 2016 NASL season, Watson was named to the NASL Best 11 for the second time in the 2016 season.

Knattspyrnufélag Reykjavíkur
On 13 March 2018, he joined Icelandic team KR.

Return to Ballymena United
In January 2019 he returned to Ballymena United.

Larne
On 3 June 2019, it was announced that Watson had signed on a full-time deal for Larne.

International career
Watson has captained the Northern Irish under-23 side.

Honours
Linfield
Irish Cup: 2011–12
IFA Premiership: 2011–12

Larne
County Antrim Shield: (3) 2020–21, 2021-22, 2022-23 
Individual

 Linfield Player of the Year: 2011–12
 North American Soccer League Best XI (2): 2013, 2016

References

1985 births
Living people
Association footballers from Northern Ireland
Ballymena United F.C. players
Linfield F.C. players
FC Edmonton players
Knattspyrnufélag Reykjavíkur players
NIFL Premiership players
North American Soccer League players
Association football defenders
Expatriate association footballers from Northern Ireland
Expatriate sportspeople from Northern Ireland in Canada
Expatriate soccer players in Canada
Expatriate sportspeople from Northern Ireland in Iceland
Expatriate footballers in Iceland
Larne F.C. players